Evan Oberg (born February 16, 1988) is a Canadian retired ice hockey defenceman. He played 7 games in the National Hockey League with the Vancouver Canucks and Tampa Bay Lightning between 2010 and 2012. The rest of his career, which lasted from 2009 to 2019, was mainly spent in the minor American Hockey League, though he also spent one season in the Deutsche Eishockey Liga. His last season was for the Lacombe Generals of the Allan Cup Hockey West (ACHW), a semi-professional league in Alberta, Canada.

Playing career
Oberg played two seasons with the Camrose Kodiaks of the Alberta Junior Hockey League (AJHL) before joining the University of Minnesota-Duluth. After six games with the Bulldogs, Oberg was seriously injured during a team practice. Pushed into the boards feet first, he dislocated his fibula, fractured his tibia and tore his left ankle on his left leg. The injuries forced Oberg to miss eight weeks. Oberg finished the season with one goal, a game-winner, and two assists in twenty-four games. Oberg's second season with Minnesota-Duluth saw improvements, as he had seven goals and twenty assists in forty-three games.

After two seasons with Minnesota-Duluth, Oberg left the school when he signed a free-agent contract with the Vancouver Canucks of the National Hockey League (NHL) on April 10, 2009. He made his professional debut with the Canucks' American Hockey League (AHL) affiliate, the Manitoba Moose. After playing 33 games with the Moose, at which point he led all Moose defencemen in scoring, Oberg was recalled by the Canucks on January 8, 2010. He made his NHL and Canucks debut on January 9, 2010, against the Calgary Flames, and was sent back to the Moose the next day. He was recalled for the second time in the season on April 10, playing in the Canucks final game of the season against Calgary. Four days later he was sent back to the Moose, joining them for their playoff series against the Hamilton Bulldogs. He played all 70 games for the Moose in the 2009–10 AHL season, and led all team defencemen in scoring with 26 points.

In 2010–11, Oberg was recalled to the Canucks on February 17, 2011. On February 28, 2011, Oberg, along with a third round pick in the 2013 NHL Entry Draft, was traded to the Florida Panthers, for left winger Chris Higgins.

On December 2, 2011, Oberg was traded by the Panthers, along with Mike Kostka, to the Tampa Bay Lightning for James Wright and Mike Vernace. Oberg was recalled by the Lightning several times throughout the season, but would be sent back to the AHL without playing a game. He finally played his first game with the Lightning on January 24, 2012, against the Columbus Blue Jackets.

At the conclusion of his contract with the Lightning, Oberg was released as a free agent and signed a one-year AHL deal with the Chicago Wolves on August 19, 2013.

On July 31, 2014, Oberg signed as a free agent with his seventh AHL club, agreeing to a one-year contract with the Portland Pirates.

Oberg signed his first professional contract abroad on July 3, 2015, agreeing to a one-year deal with German club, Augsburger Panther of the DEL.

Career statistics

Regular season and playoffs

References

External links

1988 births
Living people
Augsburger Panther players
Camrose Kodiaks players
Canadian ice hockey defencemen
Chicago Wolves players
Ice hockey people from Alberta
Manitoba Moose players
Minnesota Duluth Bulldogs men's ice hockey players
Norfolk Admirals players
People from Flagstaff County
Portland Pirates players
Rochester Americans players
San Antonio Rampage players
Syracuse Crunch players
Tampa Bay Lightning players
Undrafted National Hockey League players
Vancouver Canucks players
Canadian expatriate ice hockey players in Germany